Regional League Western Division Regional League Central-Western Division is the 3rd Level League in Thailand. It was formed in 2013 along with other four other regional leagues, all playing at the same level. The winner of each regional league enter the Regional League Championships to determine the three teams that will receive promotion to the Thai Division 1 League.

League History

Formed in 2013, 13 clubs applied to be part of the new setup;Ang Thong, Globlex, Hua Hin City, Krung Thonburi, Looktabfah, Muangkan United, Prachuap Khiri Khan, Phetchaburi, Raj Pracha Bangkokthonburi, Samut Sakhon, Seeker Futera, Singburi, Thonburi BG United

Timeline

Championship History

Member clubs

2013 establishments in Thailand
Cen